Law Committee may refer to:

 Committee on Civil Law, in Sweden
 Law Committee (French National Assembly)